Niels Alfred Wamberg (31 July 1920 – 28 May 2016) was a Danish coxswain. He competed at the 1948 Summer Olympics in London with the men's eight where they were eliminated in the round one repêchage.

References

1920 births
2016 deaths
Danish male rowers
Olympic rowers of Denmark
Rowers at the 1948 Summer Olympics
Rowers from Copenhagen
Coxswains (rowing)
European Rowing Championships medalists